is a city located in Nara Prefecture, Japan. The city was founded on October 1, 1991. In 2017, the city has an estimated population of 79,023  with 30,557 households and a population density of 3,300 persons per km². The total area is 24.23 km².

Education 
Kashiba has 10 public elementary schools, each school with a separate kindergarten, except for one (Mami Nishi).

Transportation

Rail
West Japan Railway Company
Wakayama Line: Shizumi Station - Kashiba Station - JR Goidō Station
Kintetsu Railway
 Osaka Line: Sekiya Station - Nijō Station - Kintetsu Shimoda Station - Goidō Station
 Minami Osaka Line: Nijōzan Station

Roads
Expressways
Nishi-Meihan Expressway
Japan National Route 165
Japan National Route 168

References

External links 

  

Cities in Nara Prefecture